Colletoecema is a genus of flowering plants in the family Rubiaceae. It is the only genus in the tribe Colletoecemateae. The 3 species are found from west-central tropical Africa to Angola.

Species
Colletoecema dewevrei (De Wild.) E.M.A.Petit - Central African Republic, Cameroon, Congo, Gabon, D.R.Congo, Angola
Colletoecema gabonensis Dessein & O.Lachenaud - Gabon
Colletoecema magna Sonké & Dessein - Cameroon

References

External links
Colletoecema in the World Checklist of Rubiaceae

Rubiaceae genera
Rubioideae